Timothy Eugene Scott (born September 19, 1965) is an American businessman and politician serving as the junior United States senator from South Carolina since 2013. A member of the Republican Party, Scott was appointed to the U.S. Senate by Governor Nikki Haley in 2013. He retained his seat after winning a special election in 2014, and was elected to full terms in 2016 and 2022.

Before that, he served one term (from 2009 to 2011) in the South Carolina General Assembly and served on the Charleston County council from 1995 to 2009. Before entering politics, Scott worked in financial services.

Scott is one of 11 African-Americans to have served in the U.S. Senate, and the first to have served in both chambers of Congress. He is the seventh African-American elected to the Senate and the fourth from the Republican Party. He is the first African-American senator from South Carolina, the first African-American senator to be elected from the Southern United States since 1881 (four years after the end of Reconstruction), and the first African-American Republican to serve in the Senate since Edward Brooke departed in 1979.

Early life 
Scott was born in North Charleston, South Carolina, as the son of Frances (a nursing assistant) and Ben Scott Sr. His parents divorced when he was seven years old, and he grew up in working-class poverty with his mother, who worked 16-hour days to support their family. His older brother is a sergeant major in the U.S. Army.

Scott graduated from R.B. Stall High School. He attended Presbyterian College from 1983 to 1984, on a partial football scholarship; he graduated from Charleston Southern University in 1988 with a Bachelor of Science degree in political science. Scott is an alumnus of South Carolina's Palmetto Boys State program, an experience he cites as influential in his decision to enter public service.

After graduating from college, Scott worked as an insurance agent and financial adviser. He owns an insurance agency, Tim Scott Allstate.

Political career

Charleston County Council (1995–2009)

Elections
Scott ran in a February 1995 special election for the Charleston County Council at-large seat vacated by Keith Summey, who resigned after he was elected mayor of North Charleston. Scott won the seat as a Republican, receiving nearly 80% of the vote in the white-majority district. He became the first black Republican elected to any office in South Carolina since the late 19th century.

In 1996, Scott challenged Democratic State Senator Robert Ford in South Carolina's 42nd Senate district, but lost 65%–35%.

Scott was reelected to the County Council in 2000, again winning in white-majority districts. In 2004, he was reelected again with 61% of the vote, defeating Democrat Elliot Summey (son of Mayor Keith Summey).

Tenure
Scott served on the council from 1995 until 2009, becoming chairman in 2007. In 1997, he supported posting the Ten Commandments outside the council chambers, saying it would remind members of the absolute rules they should follow. The county council unanimously approved the display, and Scott nailed a King James version of the Commandments to the wall. Shortly thereafter, the ACLU and Americans United for Separation of Church and State challenged this in a federal suit. After an initial court ruling that the display was unconstitutional, the council settled out of court to avoid accruing more legal fees. Of the costs of the suit, Scott said, "Whatever it costs in the pursuit of this goal is worth it."

In January 2001, the U.S. Department of Justice sued Charleston County, South Carolina for racial discrimination under the Voting Rights Act, because its council seats were based on at-large districts. DOJ had attempted to negotiate with county officials on this issue in November 2000. Justice officials noted that at-large seats dilute the voting strength of the significant African-American minority in the county, who in 2000 made up 34.5% of the population. They had been unable to elect any "candidates of their choice" for years. Whites or European Americans made up 61.9% of the county population. County officials noted that the majority of voters in 1989 had approved electing members by at-large seats in a popular referendum.

Scott, the only African-American member of the county council, said of this case and the alternative of electing council members from single-member districts:

I don't like the idea of segregating everyone into smaller districts. Besides, the Justice Department assumes that the only way for African-Americans to have representation is to elect an African-American, and the same for whites. Obviously, my constituents don't think that's true.

The Department of Justice alleged that the issue was not a question of ethnicity, stating that voters in black precincts in the county had rejected Scott as a candidate for the council. The lawsuit noted that because of the white majority, "white bloc voting usually results in the defeat of candidates who are preferred by black voters." The Department added that blacks live in compact areas of the county, and could be a majority in three districts if the county seats were apportioned as nine single-member districts.

The Department of Justice won the case. A new districting plan replaced the at-large method of electing the Charleston City Council. The federal court found that the former method violated the Voting Rights Act, following a lawsuit brought by the Justice Department.

Committee assignments 
 Economic Development Committee (Chair)

South Carolina House of Representatives (2009–2011)

Elections
In 2008, incumbent Republican State Representative Tom Dantzler decided to retire. With support from advisors such as Nicolas Muzin, Scott ran for his seat in District 117 of the South Carolina House of Representatives and won the Republican primary with 53% of the vote, defeating Bill Crosby and Wheeler Tillman. He won the general election unopposed, becoming the first Republican African American State Representative in South Carolina in more than 100 years.

Tenure
Scott supported South Carolina's right-to-work laws and argued that Boeing chose South Carolina as a site for manufacturing for that reason.

In South Carolina Club for Growth's 2009–10 scorecard, Scott earned a B and a score of 80 out of 100. The South Carolina Association of Taxpayers praised his "diligent, principled and courageous stands against higher taxes."

Committee assignments 

 Judiciary
 Labor, Commerce and Industry
 Ways and Means

U.S. House of Representatives (2011–2013)

Elections

2010 

Scott entered the election for lieutenant governor but switched to run for South Carolina's 1st congressional district after Republican incumbent Henry Brown announced his retirement. The 1st district is based in Charleston, and includes approximately the northern 3/4 of the state's coastline (except for Beaufort and Hilton Head Island, which were included in the 2nd District after redistricting).

Scott finished first in the nine-candidate June 8 Republican primary, receiving a plurality of 32% of the vote. Fellow Charleston County Councilman Paul Thurmond was second with 16%. Carroll A. Campbell III, the son of former Governor Carroll A. Campbell Jr., was third with 14%. Charleston County School Board member Larry Kobrovsky ranked fourth with 11%. Five other candidates had single-digit percentages.

A runoff was held on June 22 between Scott and Thurmond. Scott was endorsed by the Club for Growth, various Tea Party movement groups, former Alaska governor and vice presidential nominee Sarah Palin, Republican House Whip Eric Cantor, former Arkansas governor Mike Huckabee, and South Carolina Senator and Minuteman Project founder Jim DeMint. He defeated Thurmond 68%–32% and won every county in the district.

According to the Associated Press, Scott "swamped his opponents in fundraising, spending almost $725,000 during the election cycle to less than $20,000 for his November opponents". He won the general election against Democratic nominee Ben Frasier 65%–29%. With this election, Scott and Allen West of Florida became the first African-American Republicans in Congress since J. C. Watts retired in 2003. Scott also became the first African-American Republican elected to Congress from South Carolina in 114 years.

2012 

Scott was unopposed in the primary and won the general election against Democratic nominee Bobbie Rose, 62%–36%.

Tenure

Scott declined to join the Congressional Black Caucus.

In March 2011, Scott co-sponsored a welfare reform bill that would deny food stamps to families whose incomes declined to the point of eligibility because a family member was participating in a labor strike. He introduced legislation in July 2011 to strip the National Labor Relations Board (NLRB) of its power to prohibit employers from relocating to punish workers who join unions or strike. The rationale for the legislation is that government agencies should not be able to tell private employers where they can run a business. Scott described the legislation as a commonsense proposal that would fix a flaw in federal labor policy and benefit the national and local economies. The NLRB had recently opposed the relocation of a Boeing production facility from Washington state to South Carolina.

Scott successfully advocated for federal funds for a Charleston harbor dredging project estimated at $300 million, stating that the project was neither an earmark nor an example of wasteful government spending. He said the project was merit-based and in the national interest because larger cargo ships could use the port and jobs would be created.

During the summer 2011 debate over raising the U.S. debt ceiling, Scott supported the inclusion of a balanced-budget Constitutional amendment in the debt ceiling bill, and opposed legislation that did not include the amendment. Before voting against the final bill to raise the debt ceiling, Scott and other first-term conservatives prayed for guidance in a congressional chapel. Afterward, he said he had received divine inspiration for his vote, and joined the rest of the South Carolina congressional delegation in voting No.

Committee assignments 
The House Republican Steering Committee appointed Scott to the Committee on Transportation and the Committee on Small Business. He was later appointed to the Committee on Rules and relinquished his other two assignments.
 Committee on Rules
 Subcommittee on Rules and the Organization of the House

U.S. Senate (2013–present)

2012 appointment
On December 17, 2012, South Carolina governor Nikki Haley announced she would appoint Scott to replace retiring Senator Jim DeMint, who had previously announced that he would retire from the Senate to become the President of The Heritage Foundation. Scott is the first African American U.S. senator from South Carolina. He was one of three black U.S. Senators in the 113th Congress, alongside Mo Cowan and later Cory Booker (and the first since Roland Burris retired in 2010 after succeeding Barack Obama). He is the first African American to be a U.S. senator from the Southern United States since Reconstruction.

During two periods, first from January 2, 2013, until February 1, 2013, and again from July 16, 2013, until October 31, 2013, Scott was the only African-American senator. He and Cowan were the first black senators to serve alongside each other.

News media reported that Scott, Representative Trey Gowdy, former South Carolina Attorney General Henry McMaster, former First Lady of South Carolina Jenny Sanford, and South Carolina Department of Health and Environmental Control Director Catherine Templeton were on Haley's short list to replace DeMint. Of choosing Scott, Haley said, "It is important to me, as a minority female, that Congressman Scott earned this seat, he earned this seat for the person that he is. He earned this seat with the results he has shown."

Elections

2014 
Scott ran to serve the final two years of DeMint's term and won. In January 2014, he signed an amicus brief in support of Senator Ron Johnson's legal challenge to the U.S. Office of Personnel Management's Affordable Care Act ruling.

2016 

Scott was reelected to a full term in office. He was endorsed by the Club for Growth.

In July 2018, Scott and Senators Cory Booker and Kamala Harris introduced a bipartisan bill to make lynching a federal hate crime.

In February 2019, Scott was one of 16 senators to vote against legislation preventing a partial government shutdown and containing $1.375 billion for barriers along the U.S.-Mexico border that included 55 miles of fencing.

In April 2021, Scott delivered the Republican response to President Joe Biden's Joint Address to Congress.

On May 28, 2021, Scott voted against creating an independent commission to investigate the 2021 U.S. Capitol attack.

2022 

In August 2019, Scott said, "I plan to run for reelection, but that will be my last one, if I run." He was reelected in 2022, defeating Democratic nominee Krystle Matthews.

Tenure

Justice Act 
Scott led the drafting of a bill on race and police reform. Amid skeptical reactions from others in the Black community he tweeted, "Not surprising the last 24 hours have seen a lot of 'token' 'boy' or 'you're being used' in my mentions" and "Let me get this straight ... you DON'T want the person who has faced racial profiling by police, been pulled over dozens of times, or been speaking out for YEARS drafting this?".

Scott's 106-page Justice Act included:
Increased federal reporting requirements for use of force, no-knock warrants.
Increased penalties for false police reports.
Withhold funding for police departments that allow chokeholds when deadly force is not authorized.
Grants for expanding police body cameras with penalties for failing to use them.
Creates a database of police disciplinary records for use in hiring.
Created a federal crime for lynching.
Directed the Justice Department to provide training on deescalation tactics and implement duty-to-intervene policies.

The bill lacked provisions demanded by Democrats, including restrictions on qualified immunity. Nancy Pelosi called Scott's bill "inadequate", and said Republicans "understand that there's a need to get something done. ... They admit that and have some suggestions that are worthy of consideration—but so far, they were trying to get away with murder, actually—the murder of George Floyd." Senate Minority Whip Democrat Dick Durbin called the bill "token" legislation, although he later apologized to Scott. Two Democrats and one Independent senator who caucuses with Democrats broke with the party to support Scott's bill, but ultimately Democrats used the filibuster to block it; it received 55 of the required 60 votes.

Committee assignments

Current
 Committee on Banking, Housing, and Urban Affairs
 Subcommittee on Financial Institutions and Consumer Protection
 Subcommittee on Housing, Transportation, and Community Development (Chairman)
 Subcommittee on Securities, Insurance, and Investment
 Committee on Finance
 Subcommittee on Energy, Natural Resources, and Infrastructure
 Subcommittee on Fiscal Responsibility and Economic Growth (Chairman)
 Subcommittee on Taxation and IRS Oversight
 Committee on Health, Education, Labor, and Pensions
 Subcommittee on Employment and Workplace Safety (Chairman)
 Subcommittee on Primary Health and Retirement Security
 Committee on Small Business and Entrepreneurship
 Special Committee on Aging

Previous
 Committee on Commerce, Science, and Transportation (2013–2015)
 Committee on Energy and Natural Resources (2013–2015)
 Committee on Armed Services (2018–2019)

2024 presidential election

In late 2022, it was reported that several U.S. senators, such as John Barrasso, John Cornyn, and Joni Ernst, had encouraged Scott to run for President of the United States in the 2024 election. 

In February 2023, it was reported that Scott was preparing for a presidential run. He announced a "listening tour" that would include a Black History Month event in Charleston, South Carolina as the tour's first stop and then he hosted events and speeches throughout Iowa, which is the first state to hold elections for the 2024 Republican presidential primary.  Other announced and suspected Republican candidates were also hosting events in Iowa at the same time as Scott.

Political positions

Taxes and spending 
Scott believes that federal spending and taxes should be reduced, with a Balanced Budget Amendment and the FairTax respectively implemented for spending and taxes.

Health care 
Scott believes the Affordable Care Act should be repealed. He has said that U.S. health care is among the greatest in the world, that people all over the world come to study in American medical schools, waiting lists are rare, and that Americans are able to choose their insurance, providers, and course of treatment. Scott supports an alternative to the ACA that he says keeps its benefits while controlling costs by reforming the medical tort system by limiting non-economic damages and by reforming Medicare.

In January 2019, Scott was one of six senators to cosponsor the Health Insurance Tax Relief Act, delaying the Health Insurance Tax for two years.

Economic development 
Scott supports infrastructure development and public works for his district. He opposes restrictions on deepwater oil drilling. He proposed the opportunity zone designation in the Tax Cuts and Jobs Act of 2017.

Social issues 
Scott describes himself as pro-life. He supports adult and cord blood stem cell research, but opposes taxpayer-funded embryonic stem cell research and the creation of human embryos for experimentation. He opposes assisted suicide and same-sex marriage.

Immigration 
Scott supports federal legislation similar to Arizona SB 1070. He supports strengthening penalties for employers who knowingly hire illegal immigrants. He also promotes cultural assimilation by making English the official language in the government and requiring new immigrants to learn English. He opposes a pathway to citizenship for undocumented immigrants.

Labor 
Scott introduced a bill that would deny food stamps to families whose incomes declined to the point of eligibility because a family member was participating in a labor strike.

Foreign policy 
Scott advocated continued military presence in Afghanistan and believes early withdrawal would benefit Al-Qaeda. He views Iran as the world's most dangerous country and believes the U.S. should aid pro-democracy groups there. Scott opposed the 2011 military intervention in Libya.

China 
In November 2017, in response to efforts by China to purchase US tech companies, Scott was one of nine cosponsors of a bill that would broaden the federal government's ability to prevent foreign purchases of U.S. firms by strengthening the Committee on Foreign Investment in the United States (CFIUS) to allow it to review and possibly decline smaller investments and add national security factors, including whether information about Americans would be exposed as part of transactions or whether a deal would facilitate fraud.

Trade 
In January 2018, Scott was one of 36 Republican senators to sign a letter seeking to preserve the North American Free Trade Agreement by modernizing it for the 21st century.

Police body cameras 
After the shooting of Walter Scott (no relation), Scott urged the Senate to hold hearings on police body cameras.

Environment
In 2017, Scott was one of 22 senators to sign a letter to President Donald Trump urging him to withdraw the United States from the Paris Agreement. According to OpenSecrets, Scott has received over $540,000 in political donations from oil, gas and coal interests since 2012.

Judicial nominations

Scott did not support the nomination of Ryan Bounds to the 9th U.S. Circuit Court of Appeals, effectively killing the nomination. His decision was based on what he called Bounds's "bigoted statements he made as a Stanford student in the 1990s." Marco Rubio joined him in opposing the nomination shortly thereafter, prompting Mitch McConnell to drop the nomination.

In November 2018, Scott bucked his party in opposing the nomination of Thomas A. Farr for a federal judgeship. Farr had been accused of suppression of African-American voters. Scott cited Farr's involvement in the 1984 and 1990 Senate campaigns of Jesse Helms, which sought to suppress black voters, and a 1991 memo from the Department of Justice under the George H. W. Bush administration that stated that "Farr was the primary coordinator of the 1984 'ballot security' program conducted by the NCGOP and 1984 Helms for Senate Committee. He coordinated several 'ballot security' activities in 1984, including a postcard mailing to voters in predominantly black precincts that was designed to serve as a basis to challenge voters on election day." Further explaining his vote, Scott said the Republican Party was "not doing a very good job of avoiding the obvious potholes on race in America." In an editorial, the Wall Street Journal criticized Scott, arguing that Democrats would see Farr's defeat as a "vindication of their most underhanded and inflammatory racial tactics." In a letter to the Wall Street Journal, Scott said the publication was trying to "deflect concerns" about Farr's nomination.

President Trump and race relations
In 2017, Scott reacted to the Unite the Right rally in Charlottesville by acknowledging that "Racism is real. It is alive". Asked to comment on Trump's statement that there had been "good people" on both sides at the rally and that there was "blame on both sides" for the violence that ensued, Scott said that while Trump had initially "rejected hatred, bigotry, and racism" in his "strong" comments on the ensuing Monday, his comments on Tuesday "started erasing the comments that were strong. What we want to see from our president is clarity and moral authority. And that moral authority is compromised when Tuesday happens. There's no question about that [...] I'm not going to defend the indefensible."

Trump invited Scott to meet with him on Wednesday, after which Scott said that Trump "was very receptive to listening. That is a key to understanding", and that he had "obviously reflected on what he's said, on his intentions and the perceptions of those comments" which were "not exactly what he intended".

Scott called upon Trump to delete his tweets that attacked demonstrators against the murder of George Floyd. Scott said, "Those are not constructive tweets, without any question. I'm thankful that we can have the conversation. ... We talked about the fact that there is a constructive way to have a dialogue with a nation in this similar fashion that we had a conversation after Charlottesville, the President will listen, if you engage him with the facts of the issue". Scott also advocated that Trump delete his retweet of supporters chanting "white power", which he soon did.

Electoral history

Personal life 
Scott is unmarried. He owns an insurance agency and is a partner in Pathway Real Estate Group, LLC. Scott is an evangelical Protestant. He has said that Steven Furtick's worship song "The Blessing" is what helped him make it through the COVID-19 pandemic. He is a member of Seacoast Church, a large evangelical church in Charleston, and a former member of that church's board.

See also
 Black conservatism in the United States
 List of African-American firsts
 List of African-American Republicans
 List of African-American United States representatives
 List of African-American United States senators

References

External links
 Senator Tim Scott official U.S. Senate website
 Tim Scott for Senate
 
 
 

|-

|-

|-

|-

|-

|-

1965 births
Living people
20th-century African-American people
20th-century evangelicals
21st-century African-American politicians
21st-century American politicians
21st-century evangelicals
African-American Christians
African-American members of the United States House of Representatives
African-American people in South Carolina politics
African-American state legislators in South Carolina
African-American United States senators
American evangelicals
Black conservatism in the United States
Charleston Southern University alumni
Christians from South Carolina
People from North Charleston, South Carolina
Real estate and property developers
Republican Party members of the South Carolina House of Representatives
Republican Party members of the United States House of Representatives from South Carolina
Republican Party United States senators from South Carolina